is a former Japanese football player. She played for Japan national team.

Club career
Haneta was born on 30 September 1972. She played for Matsushita Electric Panasonic Bambina. In 1994 season, the club won L.League championship and she was selected MVP awards. She was also selected Best Eleven 4 times (1993, 1994, 1996 and 1998).

National team career
In December 1993, Haneta was selected Japan national team for 1993 AFC Championship. At this competition, on 4 December, she debuted and scored a goal against Chinese Taipei. She also played at 1994 Asian Games and 1995 AFC Championship. She was a member of Japan for 1995 World Cup and 1996 Summer Olympics. She played 30 games and scored 1 goal for Japan until 1997.

National team statistics

References

External links
 

1972 births
Living people
Place of birth missing (living people)
Japanese women's footballers
Japan women's international footballers
Nadeshiko League players
Speranza Osaka-Takatsuki players
1995 FIFA Women's World Cup players
Olympic footballers of Japan
Footballers at the 1996 Summer Olympics
Women's association football defenders
Asian Games medalists in football
Asian Games silver medalists for Japan
Footballers at the 1994 Asian Games
Medalists at the 1994 Asian Games
Nadeshiko League MVPs